WJLB (97.9 FM) is a commercial radio station in Detroit, Michigan. Owned by iHeartMedia, it broadcasts an urban contemporary radio format.  The studios are on Halsted Road in Farmington Hills.  In morning drive time, WJLB carries the syndicated Breakfast Club from co-owned WWPR-FM New York City.

WJLB has an effective radiated power (ERP) of 50,000 watts, the maximum for most Detroit stations. The transmitter is in Highland Park near the intersection of Hamilton Avenue and Midland Street. WJLB broadcasts using HD Radio technology. Its HD-2 subchannel was called "Funkytown Radio," featuring rhythmic oldies.

History

W49D, WLOU, WMZK
The station was initially authorized as W49D, with 1,000 watts of power at 44.9 megahertz. It began test broadcasts on May 7, 1941. It was Michigan's second FM radio station. The station was owned by John Lord Booth, who was born in Detroit on June 13, 1907, and died in Grosse Pointe Farms on November 11, 1994, at the age of 87. Booth already owned an AM station, 1400 WJLB, and was a major stock holder in "Booth Newspapers of Michigan." That ownership caused a delay in the FM station's grant while the Federal Communications Commission (FCC) reviewed its newspaper cross-ownership policy.

Effective November 1, 1943, the FCC modified its policy for FM call signs.  The station call letters were switched to WLOU. On September 12, 1945, WLOU was assigned to 96.5 MHz. In June 1948, the station moved to 97.9 MHz, with the station's call sign changing WJLB-FM from 1947 to 1952 and from 1957 to 1958.  From 1952 to 1957, it was WBRI.  In 1958, the call letters were changed to WMZK, which was a play on the word music.  The station aired a format of automated beautiful music. In later years, WMZK alternated between beautiful music and foreign-language programming for various ethnic groups. In 1979, the station carried the pro softball games of the Detroit Caesars.

WJLB
In 1980, the WJLB call sign returned for the third time, along with an Urban Contemporary format.  It took over the urban sound from its sister station on the 1400 kHz AM frequency.  WJLB (AM) went on the air as WMBC in 1926 and became WJLB in 1939.  It had been providing programming geared toward Detroit's African-American community for nearly four decades. (WJLB (AM) is now WDTK, owned by Salem Communications with a conservative talk format.)

Throughout the 1980s, WJLB, which was known as "Stereo 98," aired a Top 40 and Urban hybrid, also called "CHUrban", a forerunner to the current Rhythmic Contemporary format.  The station used the slogan "WJLB FM 98, Detroit's Strongest Songs" in 1986. The rollout featured a commercial of people working out to the song "Problèmes d’Amour" by Alexander Robotnick.

The station later evolved to mainstream urban contemporary as "FM 98 WJLB" by 1988.  WJLB performed well in the Detroit Arbitron ratings, despite picking up competition from several rivals, including WHYT 96.3 FM, which mixed dance music with Top 40.  In 1992, WHYT flipped to "96.3 Jamz" and aired a rhythmic contemporary format.  Another competitor arrived in 1996 at the 105.9 frequency, the former Jazz-formatted WJZZ.  It became WCHB-FM "The Beat", and later WDTJ "105.9 Jamz" (now urban AC-formatted WDMK "105.9 Kiss-FM").

FM 98 WJLB was known for its specialty Friday mix shows, with songs dating back to the 1980s, hosted by the DJ known as the "Electrifying Mojo."  WJLB also featured a Saturday Night Hip-Hop Show "The Rap Blast."  On weekends, WJLB also had "Sunday Night Segue", hosted by Johnny "Smooth" Edwards which featuring classic "Quiet Storm" tracks.  The station's popular morning show "Mason and Company" ran on WJLB from 1986-2001.

Changes in ownership
In April 1994, Booth American Company merged with Broadcast Alchemy to become Secret Communications. In August, Chancellor Media acquired the station from Secret Communications. In 1997, Chancellor Media and Evergreen, which already owned WKQI "Q95.5" and WQRS, later merged to form AMFM, Inc.  Then in November 1999, AMFM, Inc. was purchased by Clear Channel Communications.  In 2014, Clear Channel became iHeartMedia, Inc.

With iHeart owning both WJLB and Urban AC WMXD 92.3, WJLB is focusing on a younger audience.  WJLB's playlist includes more modern Hip Hop and newer titles.  It has less Old-school hip hop, R&B, and House music which is found on WMXD.  In October 2017, after 31 years as "FM 98", the station rebranded as "97.9 WJLB", featuring a logo template utilized by many of iHeart's "Real"-branded urban stations.

HD Radio
WJLB's HD-2 digital subchannel is called "Funkytown Radio."  It features rhythmic oldies, including classic disco music, dance and soul.  The subchannel changed from a Classic Hip-Hop format, which aired from its sign-on until the Fall of 2013.

References

External links
97.9 WJLB
Michiguide.com - WJLB History

FCC History Cards for WJLB (covering 1941-1981 as W49D / WLOU / WJLB-FM / WBRI / WMZK / WJLB)

JLB
Urban contemporary radio stations in the United States
IHeartMedia radio stations